Siedleckiidae is a family of parasitic alveolates in the phylum Apicomplexa. Species in this family infect marine invertebrates.

Taxonomy

This family was created by Edouard Chatton and Felix Villeneuve in 1936.

There is one genus recognised in this family - Siedleckia.

The type species is Siedleckia nematoides.

The taxonomic position of this family is unclear and it may be related to the gregarines or to the coccidians.

Description

The gamonts are elongated and flattened. They possess a smooth surface lacking any grooves or folds.

The pellicle appears to be trilaminar and longitudinal microtubules lie deep to it. The parasite attaches to the host cell via mucron.

Feeding mode is apparently by myzocytosis.

Life cycle

Species in this family infect the gastrointestinal tract and are presumably transmitted by the orofaecal route.

Species in this family infect the polychete worm Scoloplos armiger.

References

Apicomplexa families